Francisco Javier "Chiqui" Arce Rolón (born 2 April 1971) is a retired Paraguayan footballer and coach.

Arce played at the right defender position, competing a total of 61 times for the Paraguay national team between 1995 and 2004. He has the distinction of being chosen seven times as the "Ideal Team of America", thus having been nominated the most times in history. He also holds the distinction of having been selected in history as the coach on two occasions of the Paraguay national team.

Playing career
Arce started his career in Paraguay playing for his natal city club, 15 de Mayo, where he made his professional debut at the age of fifteen. The same year he was recruited by the Cerro Porteño club in the Paraguayan capital (Asuncion), where he won three national championships. Arce then played for Brazilian clubs such as Grêmio and Palmeiras and won international tournaments including the Copa Libertadores. Arce played for Paraguay in the 1998 and 2002 FIFA World Cups and has appeared 61 times for his country. He was famous for his free kick shot technique, where he scored goals during the World Cup 2002 including a freekick against South Africa.

Coaching career
After retiring as a player, Arce became a coach and managed the Paraguayan second division team Club Rubio Ñú, leading the squad to the 2nd division championship in 2008.

Arce was appointed coach of the Paraguay national football team in July 2011, but due to poor results on the 2014 FIFA World Cup qualification, he was sacked in June 2012.

In March 2013, Arce was appointed coach of the Paraguayan Cerro Porteño. He won the Torneo Clausura in 2013 with Cerro Porteño in highly impressive form, as the club went the entire Clausura undefeated. After a 4–1 defeat to Club Guaraní on 24 August 2014 Arce left Cerro Porteño.

On 15 March 2015, Arce was appointed manager of Olimpia, the arch-rivals of his old club Cerro Porteño.

A year later he coached the Guarani club with good results, leading to his position at the Paraguay national team. In 2018, he was appointed as manager of General Díaz.

Career statistics

Club
Source:

International
Source:

International goals for Paraguay
Score and results list Paraguay's goal tally first.

Honours

As a player
Cerro Porteño
 Liga Paraguaya: 1991, 1992, 1994

Grêmio
 Copa Libertadores: 1995
 Recopa Sudamericana: 1996
 Rio Grande do Sul State Championship: 1995, 1996
 Brazilian Série A: 1996
 Brazilian Cup: 1997

Palmeiras
 Brazilian Cup: 1998
 Mercosur Cup: 1998
 Copa Libertadores: 1999
 Brazilian Champions Cup: 2000
 Rio-São Paulo Tournament: 2000

As a coach
Rubio Ñú
 Paraguayan 2nd division: 2008

Cerro Porteño
 Paraguayan 1st division: 2013 (undefeated)

Club Olimpia|Olimpia
 Paraguayan 1st division: 2015

References

External links
 International statistics at rsssf
 
 

1971 births
Living people
People from Paraguarí
Association football fullbacks
Paraguayan footballers
Paraguayan expatriate footballers
Footballers at the 1992 Summer Olympics
Olympic footballers of Paraguay
Paraguay international footballers
1995 Copa América players
1997 Copa América players
1998 FIFA World Cup players
1999 Copa América players
2002 FIFA World Cup players
Cerro Porteño players
Club Libertad footballers
Grêmio Foot-Ball Porto Alegrense players
Sociedade Esportiva Palmeiras players
Copa Libertadores-winning players
Expatriate footballers in Brazil
Expatriate footballers in Japan
Gamba Osaka players
Paraguayan Primera División players
Campeonato Brasileiro Série A players
J1 League players
Paraguayan football managers
Cerro Porteño managers
Club Olimpia managers
Club Guaraní managers
Ohod Club managers
Saudi Professional League managers
Club General Díaz (Luque) managers